Memet-Raim Memet-Ali (born 1 September 2000) is a Chinese footballer currently playing as a forward for Changchun Yatai.

Career statistics

Club
.

References

2000 births
Living people
Chinese footballers
Association football forwards
Changchun Yatai F.C. players
Chinese people of Uyghur descent